Fred Fenster (born 1934) is a metalsmith and professor emeritus of the University of Wisconsin at Madison where he taught art and education.
He is particularly known for his work in pewter, influencing generations of metalsmiths.
Fenster was named a Fellow of the American Craft Council in 1995.

Career
Fenster received his B.S. in industrial arts from City College of New York in 1956. After  teaching industrial arts in the Bronx he went to Cranbrook Academy of Art where he worked with Richard Thomas. His fellow students included Stanley Lechtzin, Michael Jerry, and Brent Kington. He received his M.F.A. in metalsmithing from Cranbrook in 1960. He spent the summer of 1960 working at the Rochester Institute of Technology with Hans Christensen. He then worked for Roger Berlin in a company doing silversmithing and industrial fabrication, 

In 1961 Fenster became a professor at the University of Wisconsin at Madison.
After more than 40 years at Madison, he became a professor emeritus in 2005. Fenster lives in Sun Prairie, Wisconsin.

Fenster is a colleague and friend of Eleanor Moty.  Their works were featured together in the exhibition and accompanying catalogue Metalsmiths and Mentors: Fred Fenster and Eleanor Moty (2006) at the University of Wisconsin-Madison.
He is a founding member of the Society of North American Goldsmiths (SNAG).

Work
As a metalsmith, Fenster is influenced by the simplicity of Scandinavian design. 
Fenster makes objects that are both beautiful and usable, including jewelry, holloware, and flatware, using gold, silver, copper, and pewter. He is  often commissioned to make Judaica and  liturgical objects such as Kiddush cups. Fenster uses scoring and bending techniques to create elegant three-dimensional forms with clean, graceful lines.

Awards
 1984, American Pewter Guild award
 1995, Fellow of the American Craft Council
 1999, Underkofler Excellence in Teaching Award
 2002, Hans Christensen Sterling Silversmiths Award, Society of American Silversmiths
 2004, Renwick Alliance Award for Excellence in Teaching
 2005, Gold Medal, American Craft Council
 2011, Master Metalsmith, Metal Museum, Memphis, Tennessee
 2015, Lifetime Achievement Award, Society of North American Goldsmiths

Museums 
Fenster's works are in collections including the 
Detroit Institute of Arts,
Minnesota Museum of Art,
National Ornamental Metal Museum, 
National Museum of American Art, 
Renwick Gallery,
Smithsonian Institution,
Yale University Art Gallery, and the 
National Museum of Contemporary Art, Seoul, South Korea.

References

1934 births
Living people
20th-century American artists
American metalsmiths
Fellows of the American Craft Council